Baizley is a surname. Notable people with the surname include:

John Dyer Baizley (born 1977), American musician and painter
Marnie Baizley (born 1975), Canadian squash player
Obie Baizley (1917-2000), Canadian politician

See also
Bazley (disambiguation)
Baisley
Bailey (surname)